Rashtrotthana Parishat is a social service organisation in Karnataka, India, founded in Bangalore in 1965. It is an initiative started by few social workers to bring social reforms through service activities and publications in Karnataka.

Rashtrotthana Parishat runs various projects across Karnataka.

Rashtrotthana Rakta Nidhi (Blood Bank) is one among those. It was established in Chamarajpet, Bangalore in 1993. It is an ISO certified blood bank, provides blood for the needy 24 hours each day.

From 2011 to 2012, the blood bank collected 48,647 units of blood through various blood donation camps, and is reported to be the largest blood bank in the state.

Other projects
Other projects run by Rashtrotthana Parishat include:
Jagarana Prakalpa
Rashtrotthana Educational Institutions
Rashtrotthana Yogic Sciences & Research Institute
Rashtrotthana Arogyaseva Kendra
Goshala
Rasjtrotthana Balaga
Rashtrotthana Sahitya
Rashtrotthana Mudranalaya
Tapas
Sadhana
Samraksha

References

Organisations based in Bangalore
Non-profit organisations based in India
1965 establishments in Mysore State
Organizations established in 1965